Pomeau is a French surname. Notable people of the name include:

 René Pomeau (1917–2000), French philologist
 Yves Pomeau (born 1942), French mathematician and physicist

See also 
 Pommeau

French-language surnames